The Divorce Party is a 2019 American romantic comedy film directed by Hughes William Thompson and written by Mark Famiglietti and Lane Garrison. The film stars Thomas Cocquerel, Matilda Lutz, and Claire Holt.

Production 
Principal photography on the film began in November 2016 in Savannah, Georgia.

References

External links 
 
 

2019 films
Films shot in Georgia (U.S. state)
2019 romantic comedy films
American romantic comedy films
2010s English-language films
2010s American films